Kleinman symmetry, named after American physicist D.A. Kleinman, gives a method of reducing the number of distinct coefficients in the rank-3 second order nonlinear optical susceptibility when the applied frequencies are much smaller than any resonant frequencies.

Formulation 

For a lossless medium with spatial indices  we already have full permutation symmetry, where the spatial indices and frequencies are permuted simultaneously according to

In the regime where all frequencies  for resonance  then this response must be independent of the applied frequencies, i.e. the susceptibility should be dispersionless, and so we can permute the spatial indices without also permuting the frequency arguments.

This is the Kleinman symmetry condition.

In second harmonic generation 
Kleinman symmetry in general is too strong a condition to impose, however it is useful for certain cases like in second harmonic generation (SHG). Here, it is always possible to permute the last two indices, meaning it is convenient to use the contracted notation 

which is a 3x6 rank-2 tensor where the index  is related to combinations of indices as shown in the figure. This notation is used in section VII of Kleinman's original work on the subject in 1962.

Note that for processes other than SHG there may be further, or fewer reduction of the number of terms required to fully describe the second order polarisation response.

See also 

 Nonlinear optics
 Second-harmonic generation
 Crystal symmetry

References

Nonlinear optics
Physics articles needing attention
Second-harmonic generation